Martin LaSalle (10 August 1930 – 17 October 2018) was a French-Uruguayan actor. LaSalle first appeared in the Robert Bresson film Pickpocket (1959). Previously unknown, and in line with the director's mature practice, not then an actor, he was cast in the lead role. Following his debut, he has appeared in more than 70 films and television shows.

Personal life
From 1957 to 1965, he was married to the fashion model China Machado and they had two daughters - Emmanuelle LaSalle and Blanche LaSalle. In 1968, while on assignment with Life to photograph the 1968 Olympics in Mexico City, he met his second wife, the Mexican artist Rosa Maria Blanco Ruggerio and they had a daughter - Maria Narayani Lasala Blanco.

Selected filmography
 Pickpocket (1959)
 Acteón (1965)
 The Mansion of Madness (1973)
 Alucarda (1978)
 The Dogs of War (1980)
 Sorceress (1982)
 Missing (1982)
 Under Fire (1983)
 The Penitent (1988)
 Buster (1988)
 Nora's Will (2008)

References

External links

1935 births
Living people
Place of birth missing (living people)
20th-century French male actors
21st-century French male actors
French male film actors
French male television actors
French people of Uruguayan descent
Uruguayan people of French descent